Josh Richards may refer to:
 Josh Richards (racing driver)
 Josh Richards (internet personality)